In Greek mythology, Aoede  (Aoidē) was one of the three original Boeotian muses, which later grew to five before the Nine Olympian Muses were named.  Her sisters were Melete and Mneme. She was the muse of voice and song. According to Greek mythology, she was the daughter of Zeus, the King of the Gods, and Mnemosyne, the goddess of memory.

She lends her name to the moon Jupiter XLI, also called Aoede, which orbits the planet Jupiter.

References
Cicero, De Natura Deorum 3.21
Pausanias, 9.39.3

Boeotian characters in Greek mythology
Greek Muses